Alfonso Pardo (died 1603) was a Roman Catholic prelate who served as Bishop of Trevico (1580–1603).

Biography
On 22 June 1580, Alfonso Pardo was appointed during the papacy of Pope Gregory XIII as Bishop of Trevico.
He served as Bishop of Trevico until his death in 1603.

References

External links and additional sources
 (for the Chronology of Bishops using non-Latin names) 
 (for the Chronology of Bishops using non-Latin names)  

16th-century Italian Roman Catholic bishops
17th-century Italian Roman Catholic bishops
Bishops appointed by Pope Gregory XIII
1603 deaths